Rasir Zias Bolton (born September 27, 1999) is an American college basketball player for the Gonzaga Bulldogs of the West Coast Conference (WCC). He previously played for the Penn State Nittany Lions and the Iowa State Cyclones.

High school career
Bolton attended four different high schools during his first three years, often leaving due to changes in coaching or the athletic department. For his senior season, he transferred to Massanutten Military Academy in Woodstock, Virginia. He played a postgraduate season at the school. He competed for Team Loaded VA on the Amateur Athletic Union circuit. Bolton committed to playing college basketball for Penn State over offers from Clemson, Saint Joseph's, Virginia Tech and VCU, among others.

College career

On December 8, 2018, Bolton scored a freshman season-high 27 points, shooting 7-of-9 from three-point range, in a 76–65 win over Colgate. As a freshman at Penn State, he averaged 11.6 points, before transferring to Iowa State. Bolton later said that he left Penn State because head coach Pat Chambers told him "I want to loosen the noose that's around your neck" in January 2019. On December 31, 2019, he recorded a career-high 29 points, four rebounds and four assists in a 70–68 loss to Florida A&M. As a sophomore, Bolton averaged 14.7 points, 3.4 rebounds and 2.8 assists per game. In his junior season, he averaged 15.5 points, 4.8 rebounds and 3.9 assists per game, earning Third Team All-Big 12 honors. After the season, Bolton transferred to Gonzaga.

Career statistics

College

|-
| style="text-align:left;"| 2018–19
| style="text-align:left;"| Penn State
| 32 || 9 || 26.9 || .383 || .361 || .876 || 2.0 || 1.5 || .6 || .1 || 11.6
|-
| style="text-align:left;"| 2019–20
| style="text-align:left;"| Iowa State
| 30 || 30 || 30.8 || .404 || .336 || .848 || 3.4 || 2.8 || 1.1 || .1 || 14.7
|-
| style="text-align:left;"| 2020–21
| style="text-align:left;"| Iowa State
| 21 || 20 || 33.0 || .459 || .314 || .843 || 4.8 || 3.9 || 1.3 || .1 || 15.5
|-
| style="text-align:left;"| 2021–22
| style="text-align:left;"| Gonzaga
| 32 || 32 || 27.3 || .502 || .460 || .817 || 2.4 || 2.3 || .6 || .0 || 11.2
|- class="sortbottom"
| style="text-align:center;" colspan="2"| Career
| 115 || 91 || 29.2 || .432 || .376 || .850 || 3.0 || 2.5 || .8 || .1 || 13.0

Personal life
Bolton's father, Ray, played college basketball at Bethune–Cookman before becoming a high school coach. His older brother, Resean, played basketball for Alderson Broaddus University.

References

External links
Gonzaga Bulldogs bio
Iowa State Cyclones bio
Penn State Nittany Lions bio

Living people
1999 births
American men's basketball players
Basketball players from Virginia
Gonzaga Bulldogs men's basketball players
Iowa State Cyclones men's basketball players
Penn State Nittany Lions basketball players
Point guards
Sportspeople from Petersburg, Virginia